Can Associates TV is a British independent television production company which produced the Katie & Peter reality shows.

Peter Andre
After his divorce from Kate Price, Peter Andre continued working with Can Associates TV with Going It Alone and The Next Chapter and also relaunched his music career; he also signed a new contract with ITV2

Kerry Katona
In November 2010 Kerry Katona signed a contract with Can Associates and ITV2 to make a programme that is similar to that of Peter Andre. In June 2011, Katona and Can Associates parted company, apparently because of her wild parties in Spain. As a result of these differences, the third series of Katona's fly-on-the-wall show The Next Chapter, which was due to be broadcast in late 2011, was in jeopardy; in September 2011 ITV axed the show.

Filmography

References

External links
Can TV

Television production companies of the United Kingdom